Fairymead is a coastal locality in the Bundaberg Region, Queensland, Australia.

History 
Fairymead was originally established as the Fairymead Sugar Plantation with its associated Fairymead Sugar Mill. The heritage-listed house built by the plantation owners, Fairymead House, has been relocated to the Bundaberg Botanic Gardens.

Fairymead Provisional School opened on 20 July 1893. On 1 January 1909 it became Fairymead State School. It closed in 1983. It was located at the eastern end of Colvins Road (approx ).

See also
 List of tramways in Queensland

References

External links 

 

Bundaberg Region
Coastline of Queensland
Localities in Queensland